Jack Abraham is an American businessperson, serial entrepreneur and investor who is best known for being the founding and managing partner of startup studio and investment fund Atomic.

Career 
In 1999 at the age of 13, Abraham began working summers, nights, and weekends at ComScore, a marketing analytics company co-founded by his father Magid Abraham. After working for his father, Abraham enrolled in The Wharton School in 2004, studying technical entrepreneurship. Three years later, in 2007, Abraham dropped out of Wharton to start, local product search engine company, Milo.com.

Abraham then went on to be Head of Local at eBay. During his tenure, Abraham led the creation of the news feed for the site as well as "brought a[n] entrepreneurial mindset to eBay." In 2012, Abraham started Atomic Labs, a San Francisco based startup studio and venture capital investment firm. With limited partners including Peter Thiel and Marc Andreessen, Atomic started with an initial fund of $20 million and has raised additional funds including $260 million in 2021. Atomic has started dozens of companies, including Zenreach, TalkIQ, Playbook, and Hims & Hers Health. Jack is also the co-founder of Hims, which achieved a $1B valuation just 15
months after launch, making it the second fastest company to a $1B valuation in history.

In 2020, Abraham moved to Miami and has been credited with spurring others in Silicon Valley tech to move to Miami. Abraham opened an Atomic office in the Wynwood neighborhood's The Annex. The Annex also houses OpenStore, an Atomic-backed company that Abraham co-founded with Founders Fund’s Keith Rabois. 

Abraham is also an angel investor in Pinterest, Postmates, Invite Media, Uber, DrOnDemand, Ampush Media and Flatiron Health as well as an advisor to Felicis Ventures. He was named one of the "100 Most Creative People in Business" by FastCompany and has also been named to the Forbes' 30 Under 30 listing twice. Abraham is also the executive director of the Thiel Fellowship.

References 

Businesspeople from California
1986 births
Wharton School of the University of Pennsylvania alumni
American people of Lebanese descent
Living people